
Gmina Wierzchlas is a rural gmina (administrative district) in Wieluń County, Łódź Voivodeship, in central Poland.

Villages
Gmina Wierzchlas contains the villages and settlements of Broników, Jajczaki, Kamion, Kochlew, Kraszkowice, Krzeczów, Łaszew, Łaszew Rządowy, Mierzyce, Ogroble, Przycłapy, Przywóz, Strugi, Toporów and Wierzchlas.

Neighbouring gminas
Gmina Wierzchlas is bordered by the gminas of Działoszyn, Osjaków, Pątnów, Siemkowice and Wieluń.

References
 Polish official population figures 2006

Wierzchlas
Wieluń County